There are many cultural institutions and museums in Omaha, Nebraska. The city has a major museum, and several regionally important museums.

Museums

Art 

 The Bemis Center for Contemporary Arts, just east of Omaha's Old Market Historic District, was founded in the early 1980s and plays host to artists from all over the world. It is one of the nation's premier artists' colonies.
 Bemis was founded by Ree Kaneko, wife of famed Japanese American artist Jun Kaneko. They live in Omaha, and opened a museum called Kaneko in  2007.
Samuel Bak Museum: The Learning Center opened at the University of Nebraska at Omaha in February 2023. The museum holds over 500 paintings by Lithuanian  American artist and Holocaust survivor Samuel Bak.

Art (encyclopedic collection) 

 The Joslyn Art Museum is nationally renowned for its collections of Native American art and art works relating to the early European exploration of western North America.

Botanic conservatory 

 Lauritzen Gardens, Omaha's Botanical Center

Children's 

 Since its inception in 1976, Omaha Children's Museum has been a place where children can challenge themselves, discover how the world works and learn through play.

Cultural 

 Sokol South Omaha Czechoslovak Museum
 El Museo Latino celebrates the legacy, art and culture of Latin America, and is the first Latino art and history museum in Omaha.
 The Great Plains Black History Museum, celebrating the legacy of African Americans in Omaha and throughout the U.S. Midwest
 Henry and Dorothy Riekes Museum, located at the Staenberg Kooper Fellman Campus of the Jewish Federation of Omaha

History 

 The Durham Museum is located on 10th Street in the art deco Union Station. The museum has numerous permanent exhibits and is accredited with the Smithsonian Institution for traveling exhibits from the Smithsonian.

Specialized and historical
 Bank of Florence Museum
 Batchelder Family Scout Museum
 Boys Town Hall of History
 Florence Depot
 Florence Mill
 Freedom Park Navy Museum
 The General Crook House Museum at Fort Omaha, exploring the role of the U.S. Army during the Indian Wars of the 1900s, is part of the Douglas County Historical Society. 
 Gerald R. Ford Birthsite and Gardens
 Joslyn Castle
 Lewis and Clark National Historic Trail Headquarters and Visitor Center
 Mormon Trail Center at Historic Winter Quarters
 Nebraska School for the Deaf Museum
 Omaha Black Music Hall of Fame
 Omaha Home for Boys Visitors Center History Museum
 Trinity Cathedral Historical Society

Zoological 

 Fontenelle Forest
 Henry Doorly Zoo
 Lee G. Simmons Conservation Park and Wildlife Safari

Libraries 

 Omaha Public Library
  University Libraries, University of Nebraska Omaha

Festivals and fairs 

 Maha Music Festival
 Native Omaha Days
 Omaha Blues, Jazz, & Gospel Festival
 Red Sky Music Festival

Music, theater and performing arts 

 Astro Theater
 CHI Health Center Omaha
 Cog Factory
 Creighton Orpheum Theater
 Holland Performing Arts Center
 Omaha Civic Auditorium
 Omaha Community Playhouse
 Sokol Underground

Dance 

 Omaha Academy of Ballet
 The Rose

Opera 

 Opera Omaha

Recording studios 

 Saddle Creek Records

Symphony 

 Omaha Symphony Orchestra

Theater 

 Blue Barn Theatre
 Magic Theatre
 Shelterbelt Theatre

Not-for-profit and university galleries 

 John Beasley Theater
 Loves Jazz and Arts Center

References

See also 

 Culture of Omaha, Nebraska
 List of museums in Nebraska

 List of museums and cultural institutions
Museums and cultural institutions
Museums in Nebraska
Museums and cultural institutions
Museums and cultural institutions
Omaha
Museums, Omaha
Museums, Omaha